An Islamic emirate is a form of government in the Islamic world in which an emirate is also an Islamic state governed by Sharia, often with theocratic elements.

States and groups called Islamic emirates:
 Afghanistan, currently an Islamic emirate
 Taliban, the jihadist group which established the Islamic Emirate of Afghanistan
 Government of Afghanistan, frequently referred to as "the Islamic Emirate"
 Islamic Emirate of Afghanistan (1996–2001)
 Islamic Emirate of Badakhshan
 Islamic Emirate of Byara
 Islamic Emirate of Rafah
 Islamic Emirate of Kunar
 Caucasus Emirate

See also
 Islamic republic
 Muslim world
 Caliphate
 Theocracy
 Sharia